Arlys Johnson-Maxwell (born October 12, 1961) is a former weightlifter for the United States.

Weightlifting achievements
Senior World Champion (1987)
Seven-time Senior World Championships team member
Senior National Champion (1986–1989, 1992–1994)
Senior American record holder in snatch, clean and jerk, and total (1972–1992)

References

1961 births
Living people
American female weightlifters
21st-century American women
20th-century American women